One a Minute is a 1921 American comedy silent film directed by Jack Nelson and written by Frederick J. Jackson and Joseph F. Poland. The film stars Douglas MacLean, Marian De Beck, Victor Potel, Frances Raymond, Andrew Robson, and Graham Pettie. The film was released on June 19, 1921, by Paramount Pictures.

Plot
As described in a film magazine, college graduate Jimmy Knight (MacLean) returns to the small town of his birth where he takes over his deceased father's drug store and combats a trust's drug store that has eclipsed the older institution in the public's favor. He falls in love with Miriam (De Beck), daughter of Silas P. Rogers (Robson), the magnate controlling the trust, and fights against elimination to win her plaudits. As a desperate means of fighting the competition he places on sale a harmless concoction he calls "Knight's 99", representing it as his father's secret formula that cures all disease. Townspeople try the ointment and it cures every ailment. Jimmy becomes rich overnight and wins the girl's hand when her father cannot buy the formula. At the end it is disclosed that the fifth ingredient of the Knight's 99 responsible for the curative powers, which Rogers could not discover, is faith.

Cast 
Douglas MacLean as Jimmy Knight
Marian De Beck as Miriam Rogers
Victor Potel as Jingo Pitts
Frances Raymond as Granma Knight
Andrew Robson as Silas P. Rogers
Graham Pettie as Martin Duffey
Robert Dudley as Rogers' Attorney (uncredited)
Wilfred Lucas as Prosecutor (uncredited)
Patsy Ruth Miller as Assembly Line Worker (uncredited)
George H. Reed as J. Wellington Norcross, Townsman (uncredited)
Carl Stockdale as Judge (uncredited)

References

External links 

1921 films
1920s English-language films
Silent American comedy films
1921 comedy films
Paramount Pictures films
Films directed by Jack Nelson
American black-and-white films
American silent feature films
Films with screenplays by Joseph F. Poland
1920s American films